Joseph Gall may refer to:

 Joseph G. Gall (born 1928), American cell biologist 
 Joseph Anton Gall (1748–1807), bishop of Linz